Kos, meaning "blackbird", is a Slavic surname. It is very common in Slovenia, Croatia, Poland, Ukraine, and the Czech Republic.

It is the 10th most common surname in Slovenia. Unlike many other Slovene surnames, Kos is found throughout the country, although it's more common in the central and eastern regions than in the west.

It is the third most common surname in the Zagreb County of Croatia.

It may refer to:

 Slovenia
Božo Kos (1931–2009), Slovenian artist
Franc Kos (1853–1924), Slovenian historian
Gojmir Anton Kos (1896–1970), Slovenian painter 
Janko Kos (born 1931), Slovenian literary historian
Milko Kos (1892–1972), Slovenian historian
Vladimir Kos (born 1924), Slovenian Jesuit priest and writer
Tine Kos (1894–1977), Slovenian sculptor 

 Elsewhere
 Anatoliy Kos-Anatolsky (1909–1983), Ukrainian composer
 Ćiril Kos (1919–2003), Croatian Roman Catholic prelate
 Joanna Kos-Krauze (born 1972), Polish filmmaker
 Józef Kos (1900–2007), Polish war veteran
 Károly Kós (1883–1977), Hungarian architect
 Maja Kos (born 1968), Serbian synchronized swimmer
 Mile Kos (1925–2014), Serbian footballer
 Monika Kos (born 1967), Australian journalist
 Paul Kos (born 1942), American conceptual artist
 René Kos (born 1955), Dutch cyclist
 Rudolph Kos (born 1945), American priest
 Tomasz Kos (born 1974), Polish footballer
 Dr. Charles Kos (born 1989), Australian author

References

See also
 

Slovene-language surnames
Croatian surnames
Czech-language surnames
Polish-language surnames